Jørgen Christopher von Klenow was a Dano-Norwegian military officer.

Jørgen von Klenow was born in Mecklenburg, (now Germany) and died in 1723 in Copenhagen, Denmark. He was commandant of Akershus fortress, Christiania, Norway from 1712 through 1719.  This included the period in which Akershus successfully repelled the advance of King Charles XII of Sweden on Christiania and the siege of Akershus.  During March 1716, Akershus fortress, was besieged by a Swedish force of 10,000 troops. Jørgen von Klenow managed to collect 3,000 defenders and endured a long siege, before the Swedes finally had to retire. Norwegian forces remained intact, and forced a retreat from the capital at 29 April after inflicting significant losses of men and material. Jørgen Christopher von Klenow then took command of Kastellet—the fortifications of Copenhagen, Denmark from 1719 until his death in 1723.

References

Year of birth missing
1723 deaths
Danish military personnel
Norwegian Army personnel